James Ward (24 January 1690- 15 June 1736) was an Anglican priest in Ireland in the 18th century.

Ward was born in Dublin and educated at Trinity College, Dublin. He was Dean of Cloyne from 1726 until his death.

Notes

External links
 Hedge Deanery

Alumni of Trinity College Dublin
Deans of Cloyne
18th-century Irish Anglican priests
Christian clergy from Dublin (city)
1690 births
1736 deaths